Jacqueline Ogeil is an Australian harpsichordist.

Early life 
She studied under Gustav Leonhardt in Amsterdam (1993); her other teachers included Colin Tilney in Toronto and John O'Donnell in Melbourne.

Career 
In addition to Baroque works, Ogeil has performed contemporary repertoire including works by Naji Hakim. In 2001, she founded the Accademia Arcadia as a "baroque chamber ensemble of high originality." As of 2017, she was its director and also played a  Cristofori fortepiano for Il Diavolo alongside Davide Monti on violin and Josephine Vains on continuo cello. Ogeil has won several awards, including a Queen Elizabeth II Silver Jubilee Trust Award.

In 2010, Ogeil was appointed as a director of the historical house and gardens at Duneira in Mt Macedon.

In 2015, she was the winner of The Australian Financial Review, and Westpac 100 Women of Influence Awards for her double role as Director of Dunieira and her contribution to the Woodend Winter Arts Festival.

Discography 

 The Virtuoso Harpsichord (1995) Move Records (MD 3167)
 Buxtehude at the Harpsichord (1997) Move Records (MD 3191)
 La Follia (1998)

References

External links 

 "Bach-Cantatas.com: Jacqueline Ogeil"

Australian harpsichordists
Living people
Year of birth missing (living people)